Anthony Frank Gaggi (born Antonino Frank Gaggi; August 7, 1925 – April 17, 1988), also known as Nino Gaggi, was a capo in the New York Gambino crime family who supervised the infamous DeMeo crew, headed by Roy DeMeo.

Biography
Gaggi was born to Angelo and Mary Gaggi, Gaggi was the youngest of three children. Gaggi had a sister Marie, and a brother known as "Roy". Angelo emigrated to the United States from Palermo, Sicily, Italy and ran a barbershop on the Lower East Side of Manhattan. Mary worked as a seamstress until Gaggi's birth.

Gaggi dropped out of school during the eighth grade and followed his father into the barber business. He also earned extra money delivering flowers, which he used for gambling. It was at this age that Gaggi learned the profitability of loan sharking to gamblers.

When Gaggi was a young teenager, his family moved to New Jersey after purchasing a small farm. When Gaggi turned 17 in 1942, he attempted to join the United States Army, but was rejected due to myopia. In 1943, Gaggi's family left the farm and moved to the Bath Beach area of Brooklyn. Angelo resumed work as a barber while his mother and sister worked in a dress factory. Discharged from the Army due to injury, Roy sold peanut dispensers to bars.

After returning to New York, Gaggi decided to pursue criminal activities. His father's cousin was mobster Frank Scalise, a founding member of the Gambino crime family. Scalise helped Gaggi obtain a job at a truck dock, where he quickly became a supervisor. Scalise eventually allowed Gaggi to become a "ghost employee", someone who did not have to work. Gaggi could devote all his time to loan sharking in Brooklyn bars and pool halls. This "no show" job also allowed him to report legitimate, taxable income to the IRS and avoid prosecution for tax evasion.

Dominick Montiglio
In 1947, Gaggi's sister Marie gave birth to Dominick Montiglio. Her husband, and Montiglio's father, was boxer and deliveryman Anthony Santamaria. However, Gaggi was the dominant personality in the household, eventually leading to Santamaria's estrangement from his family. Gaggi soon became Montiglio's surrogate father. When he became older, Montiglio joined his uncle in criminal activities and eventually testified in court about them.

In 1954, after his first arrest, Gaggi was charged with running an international auto theft ring. Operating out of a used car lot in Brooklyn, the ring was backed by Scalise, now the Gambino boss. For two years, Gaggi and two associates fabricated false vehicle registrations for nonexistent Cadillacs. The gang stole cars that matched the phony vehicle descriptions and replaced their original Vehicle Identification Numbers with new fake numbers. They also gave the vehicles new license plates that matched the falsified registrations. The ring then sold the stolen vehicles in Florida, Georgia, Texas and Mexico.

Gaggi married in 1955 while his auto theft trial was underway. During his trial, witnesses "forgot" their testimony on the witness stand and Gaggi's co-defendants refused to testify against him. In early 1956, Gaggi was acquitted. Later that year, Gaggi became a father. His wife and child now lived on the first floor of the three-story Gaggi house.

In 1957, the Gambino family underwent a dramatic change in leadership. In June, Scalise was shot and killed at a fruit stand in the Bronx. In October, Gambino boss Albert Anastasia was shot to death in a barber's chair at a Manhattan hotel. Immediately after the Anastasia murder, Gaggi ordered his family to stay home for a few days. Gaggi's close associate, underboss Carlo Gambino, became the new boss. He appointed caporegime Aniello Dellacroce, an Anastasia loyalist, as underboss and gave him control over the Manhattan faction of the family.

In October 1960, Gaggi committed his first murder for the Gambino family. He served on a hit squad that murdered mobster Vincent Squillante, who is suspected of killing Scalise. According to Montiglio, Gaggi described the murder: “We surprised him (Squillante) in the Bronx. We shot him in the head, stuffed him in the trunk, then dumped him for good.” In this case, “dumped him for good” meant that they hauled the body to the basement of a building, loaded it into a trash incinerator, and cremated it. After the Squillante murder, Gaggi was inducted into the Gambino family.

DeMeo crew
By the mid-1960s, Gaggi had established a large clientele of loan shark customers and was also a silent partner in several businesses. He started to dominate the organized crime world. To increase his earnings, he partnered with mobster Roy DeMeo, who was running a stolen car ring in the Brooklyn neighborhoods of Flatlands and Canarsie. DeMeo had connections with the Lucchese crime family and a reputation as a capable and resourceful earner. Gaggi persuaded DeMeo to leave the Luccheses and work instead for the Gambinos.

Gaggi and DeMeo began making co-loans to loan shark customers. By 1970, DeMeo was officially working for Gaggi and paying him weekly tributes. In 1972, the two men forced their way into a partnership with a company that illegally processed X-rated films. After law enforcement raided the company in 1973, owner Paul Rothenberg began to cooperate with them. Gaggi ordered DeMeo to murder Rothenberg, whose body was found with bullet wounds shortly thereafter.

The Rothenberg killing was the first of many murders committed by DeMeo's crew. While Gaggi was not involved in most of these killings, he did participate in some of them. DeMeo and Gaggi shot and killed Vincent Governara, a young man with no mob ties, over a fight between him and Gaggi that had occurred twelve years before. In 1976, DeMeo killed George Byrum, an electrical contractor, who had tipped off thieves who attempted to burglarize Gaggi's Florida vacation home without knowing Gaggi and his wife were present. Under Gaggi's direction, DeMeo shot and killed Byrum in a Miami hotel room while Gaggi and another mobster, Tony Plate, attempted to dismember the body. However, they were interrupted by a construction crew outside the room that was repairing a faulty air conditioning unit, causing them to flee. The bloody corpse of George Byrum was later found by the motel maid.

In late 1976, boss Carlo Gambino died of natural causes. Before his death, he had designated Paul Castellano, his brother-in-law and head of the family's Brooklyn faction, as the new boss. However, the Manhattan faction favored Dellacroce. At a leadership meeting held at Gaggi's house, it was agreed that Castellano would become the new Gambino boss while Dellacroce was retained as underboss. Gaggi was promoted to capo of Castellano's old crew. Gaggi remained close to Castellano, hoping to become promoted to underboss.

Gaggi proposed that DeMeo be admitted into the family, but Castellano hesitated, initially because he felt DeMeo was too violent and uncontrollable. In the summer of 1977, Castellano relented and allowed DeMeo into the family. During this period, DeMeo successfully formed an alliance between the Gambino family and the Westies, a gang of Irish-American criminals that dominated Hell's Kitchen. DeMeo continued to expand his many illegal activities and passed more money over to Gaggi. Meanwhile, Gaggi expanded his loan sharking business, with a large loan he secured from Montiglio, now a Gambino associate, in charge of collecting payments from DeMeo and Gaggi's customers. Montiglio's close involvement in nearly all facets of Gaggi's criminal activities, particularly with the DeMeo crew, would bring heavy repercussions for Gaggi in the mid-1980s.

On June 7, 1978, Gaggi and nine other mobsters were charged with racketeering, conspiracy, and fraud charges as a result of a year-long federal investigation into the bankruptcy of a theatre in New York. The majority of the evidence in this case came from wiretapped conversations; fortunately for Gaggi, he never said anything incriminating. In December 1978, Gaggi was cleared of all charges.

Eppolito murders
By 1979, DeMeo was involved in loan sharking, murder-for-hire, and the operation of an auto theft ring that shipped cars to the Middle East. Gaggi received a large percentage of profits from these rackets, along with money from DeMeo's drug trafficking. The DeMeo crew sold cocaine, marijuana, and a variety of pills in large amounts. DeMeo continued his drug trade despite a public prohibition that Castellano had made against this type of racket.

Gambino capo James Eppolito told Castellano that Gaggi and DeMeo were trafficking drugs. Eppolito claimed that DeMeo had cheated Eppolito's son, a Gambino soldato, in a drug deal. In addition, Eppolito accused Gaggi of being a police informant. Eppolito asked for permission to murder Gaggi and DeMeo, but Castellano broke his own rules and sided with them. Instead, he gave Gaggi and DeMeo permission to murder both Eppolito and his son.

On October 1, 1979, Gaggi and DeMeo shot and killed both Eppolitos. However, a witness alerted an off-duty policeman, who soon found Gaggi walking away from the crime scene (DeMeo had gone in a different direction). After a brief shootout, the policeman wounded Gaggi in the neck and arrested him. Although charged with the murders, and the attempted murder of the police officer, Gaggi was only convicted of assault. He was sentenced to 5 to 15 years in federal prison.

While Gaggi was in prison, DeMeo became acting capo of Gaggi's crew. In 1981, Gaggi's sentence was overturned on appeal and he was released from prison. Gaggi had bribed a juror to make false claims of government misconduct during the trial.

Downfall
After Gaggi's release, Montiglio had become a drug addict and fled New York for fear of punishment from the Gambino family. The FBI dismantled DeMeo's auto theft ring and sent two crew members to prison. In 1980, a third crew member, Vito Arena, became a government witness. In 1982, Arena began testifying about crimes committed by Gaggi and the DeMeo crew. As the investigation intensified, Castellano became concerned about DeMeo cooperating with authorities if he were arrested. On January 20, 1983, DeMeo's body was found nearly frozen in the trunk of his car. DeMeo's killer was never identified, but law enforcement theorized that Castellano had him killed by either Gaggi or remaining DeMeo crew members. 

Shortly after DeMeo's murder, Montiglio returned to New York to collect an old loan shark debt and was arrested. To avoid prosecution, Montiglio started cooperating with the government, providing information on Gaggi and the DeMeo crew. Montiglio's information led to the indictments of both Gaggi and Castellano. By early 1984, some of the DeMeo crew members were arrested. One of them, Richard DiNome, was later murdered on February 4, 1984. As with DeMeo, DiNome's killers were never identified, but law enforcement assumed they were the remaining DeMeo crew members. DiNome's brother, Frederick DiNome, also suspected the DeMeo crew of killing Richard and agreed to become a government witness.

On February 25, Gaggi was indicted on multiple charges of racketeering and murder. Castellano was indicted the following month. The court decided to split the numerous charges against both men into two trials. The first trial would be dealing with the auto theft ring and five related murders. The first trial began in October 1985 and saw testimony from Arena, DiNome, and Montiglio. In December 1985, midway through the trial, Castellano was shot to death at the Sparks Steak House in Manhattan on orders from capo John Gotti. With Castellano's death, Gaggi became the lead defendant in the first trial. Gotti quickly assumed control of the family.

In March 1986, Gaggi was convicted of conspiracy to sell stolen cars, and was sentenced to five years in Lewisburg Federal Penitentiary. In 1988, Nino was transferred from Lewisburg to the Metropolitan Correction Center for his second trial. The second trial would focus on Gaggi's racketeering acts and on the 25 murders allegedly committed by the DeMeo crew.

Death
On April 17, 1988, while awaiting his second trial, Gaggi died of a heart attack. Gaggi had told a guard that he was suffering chest pain, but the guard did nothing. It was widely speculated that Gaggi might have survived his heart attack if prison personnel had acted sooner and sent him to the hospital. Gaggi's wife successfully sued the prison system for negligence, assisted by testimony from several other inmates. Gaggi's death sparked a controversy that eventually resulted in better medical conditions in New York City prisons.

Media
Montiglio provided writers Jerry Capeci and Gene Mustaine information on Gaggi and the DeMeo crew for their book Murder Machine. In both the book and the television documentaries, Montiglio blamed his criminal actions on Gaggi's bad influence.

Gaggi is played by Philip Williams in the 2001 made-for-television film Boss of Bosses.

In the movie The Iceman, a fictionalized version of Gaggi, named Leo Marks, is a high-ranking member in the Gambino crime family and is killed by Richard Kuklinski.

Further reading
Mustain, Gene and Jerry Capeci Murder Machine: A True Story of Murder, Madness, and the Mafia. Penguin, 1993. 
For The Sins of My Father: A Mafia Killer, His Son, and the Legacy of a Mob Life, by Al DeMeo, 2003, 
United States. Congress. Senate. Committee on Governmental Affairs. Permanent Subcommittee on Investigations. Organized Crime: 25 Years After Valachi: Hearings Before the Permanent Subcommittee on Investigations. For sale by the Supt. of Docs., Congressional Sales Office, U.S. G.P.O., 1988.

References

External links
New York Times - The City: New Trial Ordered In Brooklyn Case by United Press International
Albert Demeo on The Diane Rehm Show

1925 births
1988 deaths
American people convicted of murder
American gangsters of Italian descent
American gangsters of Sicilian descent
People from Bath Beach, Brooklyn
Gambino crime family
DeMeo Crew
American people who died in prison custody
Prisoners who died in United States federal government detention